Vazirani is a surname. Notable people with the surname include:

 Vijay Vazirani (born 1957), Indian-born American computer scientist
 Umesh Vazirani (born  1959), Indian-born American computer scientist, brother of Vijay
 Reetika Vazirani (1962–2003), Indian-born American poet